was a town located in Aki District, Hiroshima Prefecture, Japan.

On April 1, 2003, Shimokamagari was merged into the expanded city of Kure.

Dissolved municipalities of Hiroshima Prefecture